A house party is a social gathering at someone's residence. 

House Party may also refer to:

Film
 House Party (1990 film), a hip hop comedy starring recording artists Kid 'n Play
 House Party 2, a 1991 sequel
 House Party 3, a 1994 sequel
 House Party 4: Down to the Last Minute, a 2001 sequel
 House Party: Tonight's the Night, a 2013 sequel
 House Party (2023 film), an American comedy film, based on the 1990 film

Television
 House Party (Canadian TV series), a 1954–1955 talk show
 House Party (radio and TV show), a 1945–1967 show, colloquially called Art Linkletter's House Party
 ECW House Party, a 1996–1999 professional wrestling event
 "House Party", a 2009 episode of True Jackson, VP
 "House Party", an episode of SpongeBob SquarePants

Music
 House Party (Jimmy Smith album), 1958
 House Party (The Temptations album), 1975
 Houseparty (Little Willie Littlefield album), 1982
 House Party (soundtrack), from the 1990 film
 "House Party" (Sam Hunt song), 2015
 "House Party" (Meek Mill song), 2011
 "House Party" (3OH!3 song), 2010
 "House Party" (Super Junior song), 2021
 "Houseparty" (Annalisa song), 2020
 "Ain't Nothin' But a House Party", a Showstoppers and J. Geils Band song, 1967

Other
 House Party (video game), a 2017 adventure simulation video game
 House Party, Inc. (established in 2005), an American marketing company
 Houseparty (app), a 2016 mobile app
 Rent party, a Jazz Age party thrown to pay rent on a house

See also 
Haus Party, Pt. 1, a 2019 EP by Todrick Hall
Haus Party, Pt. 2, 2019
Haus Party, Pt. 3, 2020
 Noel's House Party, a 1990s UK TV show
 Regency House Party, a 2004 British historical reality television series
 Adam DeVine's House Party, a 2013 TV show
 Housewarming party